Foster Run is a  long 1st order tributary to Sugar Creek in Venango County, Pennsylvania.

Course
Foster Run rises on the Warden Run divide about 1 mile northeast of Hannasville, Pennsylvania in Venango County.  Foster Run then flows southeast to meet Sugar Creek about 0.25 miles north of Wyattville, Pennsylvania in Venango County.

Watershed
Foster Run drains  of area, receives about 44.0 in/year of precipitation, has a topographic wetness index of 410.34, and has an average water temperature of 8.27 °C.  The watershed is 68% forested.

See also 
 List of rivers of Pennsylvania
 List of tributaries of the Allegheny River

References

Rivers of Venango County, Pennsylvania
Rivers of Pennsylvania
Tributaries of the Allegheny River